Saskia Johanna Webber (born June 13, 1971) is a retired American soccer goalkeeper who previously played for the United States women's national soccer team as well as the New York Power and Philadelphia Charge in the Women's United Soccer Association. She is currently a host for Q Televisions's On Q Live.

Early life
She began playing soccer and other sports when she was six.

Webber attended Princeton High School in Princeton, New Jersey.

Rutgers University
Webber was a four-year starter on the women's soccer team at Rutgers University from 1989 to 1992. During her senior year, she helped lead the team to four consecutive East Coast Athletic Conference tournaments and three championships MVP of ECAC Tournament. She was named a two-time All-Eastern Region selection and a First-Team NSCAA All-American the same year.  She also won the Missouri Athletic Club Goalkeeper of the Year Award and was a finalist for the Hermann Trophy.

As a senior, she received the Sonny Werblin Award, the highest athletic honor at Rutgers and was the first female soccer player to be inducted into the Rutgers Athletics Hall of Fame in 1998.

Playing career

Club
Webber played three seasons for OKI F.C. Winds in the Japanese Women's Professional L. League from 1996 to 1998.

In 2001, she joined the Philadelphia Charge in the Women's United Soccer Association, the first professional women's soccer league in the United States. During the inaugural season, she played 12 games and posted a record of 4–5–3.  She played a total of 998 minutes and made 44 saves while allowing 18 goals for a 1.62 GAA. The following season, she was traded to the New York Power.

After the WUSA folded in 2003, Webber joined her former national team teammates, Brandi Chastain, Mia Hamm, Kristine Lilly to participate in the 2004 WUSA Soccer Festivals.

International
Webber first appeared for the United States women's national soccer team on August 14, 1992 at the age of 21 in a game against Norway.  In 1993, she was the team's starting goalkeeper for most of the year playing a total of 12 matches.  She was on the U.S. 1996 Summer Olympics team serving as a reserve member.

She was the back-up goalkeeper for the 1999 Women's World Cup champions. During 1999, she played in seven games posting a record of 5–0–1. 
She was a fan favorite on the 1999 U.S. Women's World Cup soccer team and was known for her red, white, and blue hairstyles.

Coaching career
Saskia has been an assistant coach at the North Carolina State and Rutgers University. During the 1990s, Saskia was Assistant Director of Soccer Plus camps and ran goalkeeper training at North Carolina State summer camps.

Television & film career
During the 2000 Summer Olympic Games in Sydney, Australia, Saskia reported and did commentary for ESPN on women's soccer.

She was a television host for Q Television's On Q Live and appeared in the film, The Kentucky Fried Movie. She has openly discussed her sexuality and has been a representative for the Gay Games, as well as covered athletes preparing for the competitions.

See also
 United States women's national soccer team
 Philadelphia Charge
 New York Power

References

External links
 Interview with Saskia Webber on Afterellen.com
 

Living people
1971 births
Rutgers Scarlet Knights women's soccer players
American women's soccer players
New York Power players
Philadelphia Charge players
United States women's international soccer players
1995 FIFA Women's World Cup players
Footballers at the 1996 Summer Olympics
1999 FIFA Women's World Cup players
Women's United Soccer Association players
Soccer players from New Jersey
Lesbian sportswomen
LGBT association football players
People from Princeton, New Jersey
Princeton High School (New Jersey) alumni
Sportspeople from Middlesex County, New Jersey
Olympic gold medalists for the United States in soccer
FIFA Women's World Cup-winning players
OKI FC Winds players
Expatriate women's footballers in Japan
American expatriate women's soccer players
American expatriate sportspeople in Japan
Women's association football goalkeepers
Medalists at the 1996 Summer Olympics
American people of German descent
LGBT people from New Jersey
American LGBT sportspeople
African-American women's soccer players
21st-century African-American sportspeople
21st-century African-American women
20th-century African-American sportspeople
20th-century African-American women